Rossiter Road is an album by American jazz pianist Ahmad Jamal featuring performances recorded in 1986 and released on the Atlantic label. The album debuted on the Billboard Top Jazz Album chart on June 7, 1986 and would spend 10 weeks on the chart, eventually peaking at #21.

Critical reception
Scott Yanow of Allmusic said, "Few of pianist Ahmad Jamal's many recordings are not worth picking up, and this effort for Atlantic boasts some fresh material and fine playing".

Track listing
All compositions by Ahmad Jamal except as indicated
 "Milan" – 5:50 
 "If I Find the Way" – 4:12 
 "Without You" – 5:18 
 "Acorn" – 4:58 
 "Yellow Fellow" (Christian Paulin) – 6:20 
 "Autumn Rain" – 5:32 
 "Winter Snow" – 4:11 
 "Rossiter Road" – 6:09

Personnel
Ahmad Jamal – piano
James Cammack – bass
Herlin Riley – drums 
Manolo Badrena – percussion

References 

Atlantic Records albums
Ahmad Jamal albums
1986 albums